Novosretenka is a rural locality (a selo) in Bichursky District, Republic of Buryatia, Russia. The population was 573 as of 2010. There are 3 streets.

Geography 
Novosretenka is located 20 km northeast of Bichura (the district's administrative centre) by road. Motnya is the nearest rural locality.

References 

Rural localities in Bichursky District